Rym Saidi Breidy ( Saidi) (born 21 June 1986 in Tunis) is a Tunisian International Top model  and actress.

Career
Rym Breidy (née Saidi) started her career as a model in 2003 after winning the Elite Model Look Tunisia. In 2006, she won the first edition of the Arabic reality show MISSION FASHION on LBC TV under the supervision of the Lebanese fashion designer Elie Saab.
In 2007, she signed with major model management in Paris and today represented by MP Models
She is also represented by Profile models in London, women model management in Milan, MP Management in Paris, One.1 management in New York City, Munich models in Germany, MP Mega in Miami.

In Italy, she became recognized after her campaign for WIND (Italy) with Italian comedian Giorgio Panariello and then her appearance as Mother Nature (Madre Natura) in the Italian TV Show Ciao Darwin.

Tourism Ambassador For Tunisia
In Tunisia, Breidy has participated in campaigns to help promote the Tourism industry of the country. She has also been the face for the Tunisian travel agency Traveltodo since 2013.

2015 controversy
However, in 2015 her future involvement with the company and other tourism campaigns, was called into question over comments she made on a radio station where she admitted that she had previously prevented her friends from visiting Tunisia due to the current political instability of the country and security threats. Stating the following;

"They have nothing to do in Tunisia. We couldn't invite people into such unsafe conditions ... We couldn't put the lives of others in jeopardy"'

General management of Traveltodo responded by stating that her remarks were inappropriate, because they undermined the tourist reputation of Tunisia and its image on an international scale.

Personal life
Since 2008, Breidy has been residing in Milan. She has also been studying economics and mathematics sciences part-time. On July 16, 2017, she married Lebanese television presenter Wissam Breidy in Milan. The couple met on the fourth season of the Arabic version of the reality television series Dancing With The Stars in 2016.

On March 22, 2018, she announced she was pregnant with her first child. A girl named Bella Maria Breidy was born on September 8, 2018. She had her second girl, Aya Sophia, on 14 January 2020.

References

1986 births
Living people
Tunisian actresses
People from Tunis
Tunisian emigrants to Italy
Tunisian female models
21st-century Tunisian actresses